Ersfjorden is a fjord in the Tromsø municipality of Norway. It is 12.5 kilometers long and begins on the western side of Kvaløya.

References 

Fjords of Troms og Finnmark
Senja